Frank Miller Ruff Jr. (born September 22, 1949) is an American politician. A Republican, he served in the Virginia House of Delegates 1994–2000 and was elected to the Senate of Virginia in November 2000. He  the 15th district, which includes six whole counties and parts of five others in Southside Virginia. He is a member of the Agriculture, Conservation and Natural Resources, Education and Health, General Laws and Technology, and Local Government committees.

Notes

References

 (Constituent/campaign website)

External links

1949 births
Living people
Republican Party Virginia state senators
Republican Party members of the Virginia House of Delegates
University of Richmond alumni
People from Bedford County, Virginia
21st-century American politicians
People from Clarksville, Virginia